Jeotgalicoccus schoeneichii is a Gram-positive, non-spore-forming and non-motile bacterium from the genus of Jeotgalicoccus which has been isolated from air from a pig barn from North Rhine-Westphalia in Germany.

References

 

schoeneichii
Bacteria described in 2016